Motaharabad-e Tajabad (also Romanized as Moţaharābād-e Tājābād; also known as Moţaharābād and Tājābād) is a village in Vahdat Rural District, in the Central District of Zarand County, Kerman Province, Iran. At the 2006 census, its population was 1,798, in 441 families.

References 

Populated places in Zarand County